Dimma is an Icelandic rock / metal band based in Reykjavík that has released six studio albums.

Members
The band is made up of four members:
Stefán Jakobsson - Vocals
Ingó Geirdal - Guitar
Egill Örn Rafnsson - Drums
Silli Geirdal - Bass

Former members
Hjalti Ómar Ágústsson - Vocals
Birgir Jónsson - Drums

Discography

Albums
2005: Dimma
2008: Stigmata
2012: Myrkraverk 
2014: Vélráð
2017: Eldraunir
2021: Þögn

Live albums
2013: Myrkraverk í Hörpu
2015: "Guði gleymdir"

Singles
2014: "Ljósbrá"
2014: "Vélráð"
2014: "Ég brenn"

References

External links
Facebook
Tónlist page

Icelandic heavy metal musical groups
Musical groups from Reykjavík